Gymnocypris chilianensis is a species of cyprinid fish endemic to China. It may be a synonym of Gymnocypris eckloni.

References 

chilianensis
Fish described in 1974
Taxa named by Li Sizhong (ichthyologist)